Events from the year 1950 in art.

Events
 Austrian painter Arnulf Rainer founds the Hundsgruppe ("dog pack") with Arik Brauer, Ernst Fuchs and Josef Mikl.
 Paint by number kits introduced by Max S. Klein, an engineer and owner of the Palmer Paint Company of Detroit, and Dan Robbins.
 Ernst Gombrich's The Story of Art is published by Phaidon Press.

Awards
 Archibald Prize: William Dargie – Sir Leslie McConnan
 Audubon Artists Gold Medal – Richmond Barthé

Works

 Jean Arp – Evocation of a Form: Human, Lunar, Spectral (model for bronze)
 Francis Bacon – Fragment of a Crucifixion
 Max Beckmann – Falling Man
 Marc Chagall – La Mariée
 Salvador Dalí – The Madonna of Port Lligat (second version, Fukuoka Art Museum)
 Max Desfor – Flight of Refugees Across Wrecked Bridge in Korea (photograph)
 Robert Doisneau – Le baiser de l'hôtel de ville (The Kiss) (photograph)
 Alberto Giacometti – The Chariot
 Maruki Iri and Maruki Toshi – Ghosts, Fire and Water (Yūrei, Hi and Mizu), first of The Hiroshima Panels (原爆の図, Genbaku no zu)
 Oskar Kokoschka – The Myth of Prometheus (triptych)
 L. S. Lowry – The Pond
 Henri Matisse – Beasts of the Sea (paper collage)
 Joan Mitchell - Figure and the City'''
 Jackson Pollock – Autumn Rhythm (Number 30) William Scott – Bowl, Eggs and Lemons Vladimir Tretchikoff – Chinese Girl, popularly known as "The Green Lady"
 Keith Vaughan – Theseus and the Minotaur'' (Tate Britain)

Births
April 22 – Thierry Zéno, Belgian filmmaker
 June 24 – Bob Carlos Clarke, Irish photographer (d. 2006)
 July 29 – Jenny Holzer, American neo-conceptual artist
 August 30
 Konrad Bernheimer, Venezuelan-born German art dealer and collector
 Antony Gormley, English sculptor
 September 4 – Kobe (Jacques Saelens), Belgian visual artist and sculptor
 November 10 – Jonathan Janson, American painter and art historian
 December 11 – Aleksandr Tatarskiy, Russian animator, artist and film director (d. 2007)
 David Ruben Piqtoukun, Canadian Inuit sculptor

Deaths
 February 12 – Boris Vladimirski, Soviet painter of the Socialist Realism school (b. 1878)
 February 15 – Albert Herter, American painter (b. 1871)
 April 5 – Hiroshi Yoshida, Japanese painter and woodblock printmaker (b. 1876)
 September 26 – Pierre Roy, French-born painter, illustrator and designer (b. 1880)
 December 7 – Wojciech Weiss, Polish painter and draughtsman (b. 1875)
 December 28 – Max Beckmann, German painter (b. 1884)
 James Sleator, Irish painter (b. 1889)

See also
 1950 in fine arts of the Soviet Union

References

 
Years of the 20th century in art
1950s in art